Iryna Shutska (born 5 March 1983), formerly known as Iryna Sheyenko, is a Ukrainian handballer playing for the Romanian club HC Dunărea Brăila and the Ukraine national team.

References

Sportspeople from Kropyvnytskyi
1983 births
Living people
Ukrainian female handball players
Expatriate handball players
Ukrainian expatriate sportspeople in Romania